Ratna Kapur is a law professor and former director of the Center for Feminist Legal Research in New Delhi, India [1995–2012].

Education and career
Ratna Kapur has a B.A. and M.A. from Cambridge University and an LLM. from Harvard Law School.

Professor Kapur is currently working as a visiting professor of law at the Queen Mary University of London. Prior to this, she was a professor at Jindal Global Law School in India. She is also a Senior Faculty member at the International Global Law and Policy Institute at Harvard Law School.

She has worked as a practicing lawyer in India and been a visiting professor at a number of universities around the world, including Yale Law School, NYU School of Law, Georgetown University Law Center, UN Peace University (Costa Rica) and the National Law School of India, Bangalore. She has also been a visiting fellow at Cambridge University and Harvard University.

Ratna Kapur has also worked with the United Nations, serving as the Gender Adviser at the United Nations Mission in Nepal, the Organization's special political mission to support Nepal's peace process following a decade-long internal armed conflict.

She has taught and published on human rights, international law, postcolonial theory, and legal theory.

Kapur serves on the international advisory boards of the academic journals Legal Studies and Signs: Journal of Women in Culture and Society.

Works
Ratna Kapur has written on issues such as Triple Talaq, the right to die, sex work, same-sex marriage, marital rape, sexual harassment, etc.

Books: 

 An edited collection entitled Feminist Terrains in Legal Domains: Interdisciplinary Essays on Women and Law(Kali for Women, New Delhi, 1996)
 She has co-authored Subversive Sites: Feminist Engagements with Law (1996) with Brenda Cossman;
 Secularism's Last Sigh?: Hinduvata and the (Mis)Rule of Law (Oxford University Press, 1999, reprinted 2001).
 Erotic Justice: Law and the New Politics of Post-colonialism (Cavendish: London, 2005)
 Makeshift Migrants and Law: Gender, Belonging and Postcolonial Anxieties (Routledge, 2010)
 Gender, Alterity and Human Rights: Freedom in a Fishbowl (Edward Elgar Publishers, Legal Theory Series, 2018)

Selected Publications: 

 "The (Im)-Possibility of Queering International Law", in Dianne Otto, ed., Queering International Human Rights (Rutledge 2017)
 The Colonial Debris of Bandung: Equality and Facilitating the Rise of the Hindu Right" in Luis Eslava, Michael Fakhri and Vasuki Nesiah, eds., Bandung, Global History and International Law: Critical Pasts and Pending Futures ( Cambridge University Press, 2017)
 Book Reviews: On Wendy Doniger and Martha Nussbaum, eds. Pluralism and Democracy in India" 31(3) Journal of Religion and Law 406 (2016) 
 Book Review: On Ben Golder, Foucault and the Politics of Rights,39(4) University of New South Wales Law Journal 1472 (2016)
 "Precarious Desires and Ungrievable Lives: Human Rights and Postcolonial Critiques of Legal Justice" 3(2) London Review of International Law 267 (2015)
 "The "Ayodhya" Case: Hindu Majoritarianism and the Right to Religious Liberty" 29 Maryland Journal of International Law 305 (Fall 2014)
 "In the Aftermath of Critique We are not in Epistemic Free Fall: Human Rights, the Subaltern Subject, and the Non-Liberal Search for Freedom and Happiness" 25 (1) Law and Critique 25–45 (2014)
 "A Leap of Faith: The Construction of Hindu Majoritarianism through Secular Law" 113 (1) South Atlantic Quarterly 109–128 (2014).
 "Brutalized Bodies and Sexy Dressing on the Indian Street" 40 SIGNS: Journal of Women in Culture and Society 1 (2014)
 "Gender, Sovereignty, and the Rise of a Sexual Security Regime in International Law and Postcolonial India", 14(2) Melbourne Journal of International Law 1–26 (2013)
 "Hecklers to Power? The Waning of Liberal Rights and Challenges to Feminism in South Asia" in Ania Loomba and Ritty Lukose, eds., South Asian Feminisms, 333–355 (Duke University Press 2012)
 "Emancipatory Feminist Theory in Postcolonial India" in Aakash Rathore Singh and Silika Mohapatra (eds.) Indian Political Thought: A Reader, 257–268 (Routledge 2010)
 "De-Radicalizing the Rights Claims of Sexual Subalterns Through 'Tolerance'" in Kim Brooks and Robert Leckey, eds., Queer Empire: Comparative Theory, 37–52 (Routledge, 2010)
 "Normalizing Violence: Transnational Justice and the Gujarat Riots" 15:3 Columbia Journal of Gender and Human Rights 885–927 (2006)
 "Human Rights in the 21st Century: Taking a Walk on the Dark Side", 28:4 Sydney Law Review 665–687 (2006)
 "The Tragedy of Victimization: Implications for International Women's Rights and Post-Colonial Feminist Legal Politics", 15 Harvard Human Rights Journal, 1 (Spring, 2002)
 "The Right to Freedom of Religion and Secularism in the Indian Constitution" in Mark Tushnet and Vicki Jackson, eds, Defining the Field of Comparative Constitutional Law, 199–213 (Praeger Publishers 2002)
 "Secularism's Last Sigh? Democracy, the Hindu Right and Law in India" 38:1 Harvard International Law Journal (January 1997).

References

1959 births
Living people
Indian feminist writers
Alumni of the University of Cambridge
Harvard Law School alumni
Scholars from Delhi
Free speech activists
Domestic violence awareness
Indian women scholars
Academics and writers on bullying
Educators from Delhi
Women educators from Delhi
20th-century Indian lawyers
20th-century Indian women lawyers
21st-century Indian lawyers
21st-century Indian women lawyers